Costas Stavrou (born 20 January 1965) is a retired Cypriot football defender.

References

1965 births
Living people
Cypriot footballers
Ethnikos Achna FC players
Anorthosis Famagusta F.C. players
APOEL FC players
Association football forwards
Cypriot First Division players
Cyprus international footballers